The men's standing high jump was a track and field athletics event held as part of the Athletics at the 1904 Summer Olympics programme. It was the second time the event was held. It was held on August 31, 1904. 5 athletes from 2 nations competed. Ray Ewry continued his dominance of the standing jumps at the Olympics, successfully defending his championships in this one as well as the other two. Joseph Stadler took silver, with Lawson Robertson earning bronze to complete the American sweep (this was only one of the three standing jumps with a non-American competitor, so the sweep here was not guaranteed).

Background

This was the second appearance of the event, which was held four times from 1900 to 1912. Defending champion Ray Ewry of the United States was heavily favored.

Hungary made its debut in the event. The United States made its second appearance, the only nation to have competed previously in the 1900 Games.

Competition format

There was a single round of jumping.

Records

These were the standing world and Olympic records (in metres) prior to the 1904 Summer Olympics.

No new world or Olympic records were set during the competition.

Schedule

Results

Sources

 

Athletics at the 1904 Summer Olympics
1904